Mount Verd is a small unincorporated community in McMinn County, Tennessee, northwest of the city of Athens.  Mt. Verd is home to the Mt. Verd Baptist Church.

References

Unincorporated communities in Tennessee
Unincorporated communities in McMinn County, Tennessee